is a Japanese manga series by Kitsune Tennouji which began serialization in July 2009. An original net animation (ONA) series by Xebec was streamed on Nico Nico Douga and Crunchyroll between April and June 2012. The series started airing on Japanese television in July 2012.

Plot
The series takes place at a school known as Seishou Academy. Unlike an average school, all the students are actually personifications of guns, training to one day become a useful weapon, and is divided up into elementary school (submachine guns), middle school (assault rifles & shotguns), and high school (battle rifles & sniper rifles). They are capable of drawing the weapons they represent from out of thin air and using them, and any student or her manifested gun can suffer from any gun-related problem the other might have. All students in Seishou train to shoot their target (literally) using live ammunition. The series mainly focuses on an FN FNC assault rifle nicknamed Funco and her friends with their human teacher.

Characters

Assault Rifle Class
 

The main protagonist, an energetic girl who is a Belgian FN FNC. She is the younger sister of Fal, and she is noted to write in Dutch (as opposed to French). As the real FNC has a skeleton stock, she wears a thong instead of panties, much to her embarrassment and occasional anger. Ever since their first meeting, she has displayed an affection towards her homeroom teacher, though the feelings are one-sided.

 

Funco's best friend, who nicknames her  due to a spelling mistake. She has an energetic personality and a foul mouth with Osaka dialect, but is very kind. She is an American M16A4 assault rifle (her name literally means "one" and "six") and has a large number of fans, as she is usually photographed for the cover of specialized gun magazines. In non-combat action, she tends to rapidly alternate between bursts of activity and sudden rests, relating to her namesake's three-round burst fire only capacity. She is Ichihachi's own sister, who was adopted by the Colt family, and Ichiyon's younger foster sister-in-law.

 

Another close friend of Funco. She is a Swiss SIG SG 550 assault rifle. Her grades are top notch and she's an honor student, but a bit out of it at times. She sports exceptional firing accuracy at mid-to-long-range (using improved 5.56×45mm GP90 rounds instead of standard 5.56×45mm NATO rounds) and able to survive in freezing temperature (similar to real SG 550), and doesn't like to lose. She appears to have feelings for Funco and gets jealous when others get close to her.

 

Another close friend of Funco and Ichiroku's roommate. She is a British L85A1 assault rifle (her name stands for the letter "L" in her weapon's name). Shy and clumsy, she has an unreliable nature and the habit of breaking a lot, but is very enduring for the sake of her friends, just like her namesake gun. She idolizes Funco's elder sister Fal.

 /  

Funco's roommate (Funco nicknames her Hach-chan) and Ichiroku's own sister, who stayed with the failed Armalite family. She is a Japan-made American AR-18 assault rifle (her name literally means "one" and "eight"). She is often troubled by her loose pants as a result of the real AR-18, which has a loose stock.

 

A transfer student and rather vicious control freak determined to defeat Ichiroku in the mock battle. She is a Finnish SAKO RK 95 TP assault rifle. Following the mock battle tournament, she has taken a liking to Funco and has even taken her first kiss when Sako leaves the school. She has elf-like ears.

 

Another transfer student and Sako's partner. She is an Israeli Galil AR, and just like Sako, she harbors a rivalry towards Ichiroku as both are variants of an old enemy of hers, the AK-47. After losing the mock battle, she decides to stay at the school despite Sako's departure becoming quite fond of Ichihachi, who helped her on that time. She also has blue dog ears and a tail. She is sometimes nicknamed "Miss Kitty", mostly by Ichiroku.

 

Member of the student council. She is an Austrian Steyr AUG A1 and just like her namesake weapon can change barrels for different uses, Aug has two personalities: one with short hair, timid and friendly, and another with long hair that is aggressive and imposing; her short hair is a wig. Both personalities have their own issues regarding Funco; while one is too shy to approach Funco, the other usually leaves her scared.

 

Aug's close friend who supports her in confessing her feelings for Funco. She is a Taiwanese T91 and is usually nicknamed "Fountain" by Ichiroku because of the multiple pigtails she wears throughout her hair.

 

She is an Argentine FARA 83 assault rifle.

 

She is a Spanish CETME Model L assault rifle.

 

She is a Singaporean SR 88 assault rifle.

 

She is a Singaporean SAR 21 assault rifle. She has a crush on the Human teacher.

 

She is a German HK33E assault rifle and Jeethree's younger sister. She is often nicknamed "Chuthree" after her sister (claimed to be failed derivative of G3), which annoys her, while Ichihachi calls her "Mimi" after the two 3s in her name.

 
She is an Italian Benelli M3 shotgun and member of the student council.

 
Vice-president of the student council, she is an American M4A1 assault rifle.

 Betty
An Italian Beretta SC70/90 assault rifle. During the trip to the beach, she sets some schemes to get close to Genkoku, much to Funco's jealousy.

 Type 89
She is a Japanese Howa Type 89 assault rifle. Having a timid demeanor, she can't leave Japan just like her fellow rifle Type 64, for being exclusively designed for use of the JSDF.

 Cal
Funco's direct elder sister, a FN CAL assault rifle. Was introduced to be included in the big fight Seishou Academy had with Red Steel at Hakone. However, to imitate the constant breakdown it suffers across its production life and extremely poor sales with led to the FN FNC (Funco) being made, she is shown to have an extreme tummyache while travelling to the fightzone which renders her useless and went back home without even reaching Hakone.

 Fem
A Swedish Ak 5 assault rifle. Spy for Sako and due to her lookalike with Funco (Being a licensed copy of the FN FNC that's made for the Swedish), was captured and lured Fal into a trap which caused Fal to be destroyed into pieces in the process.

 Famas
A French FAMAS bullpup assault rifle. Working with a Japanese police department in ridding of crime in the northern sector of the Kanto region. Tried to stop the fight between Seishou and Red Steel (Akagane) with Type 89 and Type 64 but instead joined Seishou's side with Type 64 after knowing their intentions of being in the fight.

Battle/Sniper Rifle Class

 /  

Funco's elder sister. She is an English-made L1A1 battle rifle (named as FAL L1A1 in manga and anime, not to be confused with the original Belgian FN FAL). The natural leader of her class, Fal has it all: excellent grades, popularity, and beauty. In the manga, Fal is almost destroyed during the mission to rescue the Modern Literature Teacher from Red Steel High, and although the broken parts were replaced, the bolt, the part of her body containing all her previous memories, is still in possession of Akagane, which she uses as a leverage against Funco and the others. As it turns out, Funco has two sisters that are both, FALs. One follows the traditional pattern of metric measurement FN FAL being her original sister while the imperial measurement L1A1 "FAL" is Funco's guardian "sister".

 

Ichiroku's elder sister-in-law from the Springfield Armory family and Fal's roommate. She is an American M14 battle rifle (her name literally means "one" and "four"). She has a tomboyish personality: beautiful if she stays quiet, but she's often crude and rowdy. She has an ear for corny jokes, which she perceives as coming off silky smooth, but in reality have a husky delivery that annoys the other characters.

 

Jeethree is a German G3A3 battle rifle. Despite her strict appearance, she is actually very caring. She has many little sisters in the Submachine Class, and an effective but embarrassing posture that improves her full-auto shooting capability without worrying much about the recoil. Her sniping skill is top class, and she often wears dark pantyhose.

 Type 64
She is a Japanese Howa Type 64 battle rifle. Having a dignified air and usually seen in a kimono, she can't leave Japan just like her fellow rifle Type 89, for being exclusively designed for use of the JSDF.

Submachine Gun Class
 

She is a German MP5A2 submachine gun and one of Jeethree's younger sisters. Despite Jeethree having several sisters, Empee seems to be the favorite one, owing to her as one of the most popular Submachine Gun. Also nicknamed Chithree (Chi for Chibi, a little Jeethree). Her elementary sisters family consists of MP5K, UMP45, MP7 (who happens to have the same vs Uzi rivalry towards FN P90, HK53)

 

She is an American MAC-10 (M-10) submachine gun. Similar to her namesake gun, she talks rapidly in one stroke, leaving her out of breath afterwards.

 

She is a German HK53 submachine gun (her name literally means "five" and "three"). As a submachine gun designed to fire intermediate rounds, she is much taller and looks much older than her classmates.

 
She is an Israeli Uzi submachine gun and Empi's self-proclaimed rival.

 TMP
She is an Austrian Steyr TMP and Aug's younger sister. Due to being a stockless submachine gun, she has the habit of wearing no panties, and just like her older sister, she idolizes Funco.

 Jatimatic
She is a Finnish Jatimatic submachine gun and extremely obnoxious. Often wearing a pair of sunglasses as a homage to Marion Cobretti character in Cobra where the weapon gets its fame and even flips off Red Steel Academy's shooters despite being damaged herself during the battle at Hakone.

Red Steel High School
 Akagane
The leader of the Akaganekou Group. She is a Soviet / Russian AK-47.

 

She is a Soviet / Russian AK-74 assault rifle, a school leader.

 AN-94
She is a Russian AN-94 assault rifle, wounded by Sig at the Battle of Atami.

 Tantal
She is a Polish kbk wz. 88 Tantal assault rifle.

 
She is a full-auto version of the Chinese Type 86S rifle, wounded by Elle at the Battle of Atami.

 

She is a Russian Saiga-12K shotgun.

 RPK

She is a Soviet / Russian RPK light machine gun.

 Dragunov
She is a Soviet Dragunov SVD sniper rifle.

 Bizon
She is a Russian PP-19 submachine gun.

Teachers
 

Homeroom teacher for Funco and the others, and the only human character other than the Colonel at Red Steel High, whose real name and nationality is unknown. He was appointed to Seishou Academy unaware about the girls' nature. He usually comes into some misunderstandings with Funco (usually regarding her underwear), leaving him at the receiving end of her anger, but Funco cares about him and sometimes dreams about being chosen as his personal weapon. Later it is revealed that he's an American who is a descendant of John Moses Browning and despite not having any knowledge of firearms designing like his ancestor, he is kidnapped by the students of Red Steel High School for unknown reasons.

 

A teacher of the Battle rifle class, she is a German FG 42 battle rifle. She has heterochromia and wears on eye patch on her right eye. Due to her usual appearance being similar to a World War II German Wehrmacht serviceman, more leaning to the Paratrooper division, even the Japanese Teacher didn't recognize her when she removes her eyepatch and loosens her hair on one occasion.

 

A teacher of the submachine gun class, she is an American M1928 Thompson submachine gun and a very easy-going personality. In the anime, it is noted that she speaks Japanese with a slight American accent. She is also photographed for the cover of specialized gun magazines. Revealed to have worked with the FBI by Suomi before joining Seishou as a teacher (The FBI used Thompson SMGs from the late 1920s to the 80s).

 

The principal of Seishou Academy. He is a M1903 Springfield rifle and the only one who knew of Genkoku's ancestry when he started working at the school.

 

The main instructor at Seishou Academy, usually seen as a World War II era USMC Drill Instructor. He is an M1 Garand rifle. He was one of the few people that knew the Human teachers true name.

 
The teacher responsible for the submachine class' dorm. She is a German MP 40 submachine gun and is named after the shortage for Erfurter Maschinenfabrik, where the MP 40 was originally produced.

 

She is a French MAS 49 (Modèle 1949 or Mle 1949) rifle and she is a librarian.

 

The school nurse. She is a Swiss SIG SK 46 semi-automatic rifle, a successor to the bolt-action K31.

 Suomi
A teacher in the submachine gun class. He's a Finnish Suomi KP/-31 submachine gun. A spy and collaborator for Red Steel and no one could ever remember his name nor face (Possibly to mock it being alike to the Russian PPsh) and was taken out by Ms. Thompson who caught on his act.

Media

Manga
The original manga by Kitsune Tennouji began serialization in Kadokawa Shoten's Young Ace magazine from July 4, 2009, before moving over to Shōnen Ace from June 2011. A 4-Koma sideseries entitled "Upotte Nano" ran in 4-Koma Nano Ace from 2011 to 2013, when the magazine folded.

Anime
An original net animation series by Xebec was streamed on Nico Nico Douga and Crunchyroll between April 8, 2012 and June 9, 2012, also streaming on the Anime Network from May 9, 2012. A television broadcast of the series began in July 2012. The anime has been licensed in North America by Sentai Filmworks.

A Blu-ray containing an extra episode of the anime series was be bundled with limited editions of the fourth volume of the manga series, released on October 13, 2012. Sentai Filmworks later released the series on Blu-ray and DVD on March 18, 2014.

Episode list

References

External links
  
 

2009 manga
2012 anime ONAs
2012 anime television series debuts
Comedy anime and manga
Girls with guns anime and manga
Kadokawa Dwango franchises
Kadokawa Shoten manga
Moe anthropomorphism
School life in anime and manga
Seinen manga
Sentai Filmworks
Shōnen manga
Xebec (studio)